Kółko Żabieckie  is a village in the administrative district of Gmina Pacanów, within Busko County, Świętokrzyskie Voivodeship, in south-central Poland.

As of March 2009, the village has a population of 538.  The village is best known for its annual "Celebration of the Sun", which is themed around a regional variant of the folk tale, The Peasant's Wise Daughter.

References

Villages in Busko County